The IIHF World Junior Championship is an annual event organized by the International Ice Hockey Federation for national under-20 ice hockey teams from around the world. It is traditionally held from late December to the beginning of January. The main tournament features the top ten ranked hockey nations in the world, comprising the "Top Division", from which a world champion is crowned. There are also three lower pools—divisions I, II and III—that each play separate tournaments playing for the right to be promoted to a higher pool with the last place team facing relegation to a lower pool.

The first official tournament was held in 1977. Prior to that, there had been invitational tournaments in 1974, 1975 and 1976 that were not sanctioned by the IIHF.

As of 2023, 47 official tournaments have been staged, while the 2022 tournament was postponed due to the COVID-19 pandemic. Six nations have won a gold medal and ten have won medals. Historically, the tournament has been dominated by Canada (20 gold medals) and the Soviet Union / CIS / Russia (13 gold medals). The USSR won the first four official tournaments, while the Canadians put together five straight championships between 1993 and 1997, and another five straight from 2005 to 2009. Canada leads the all-time gold medal count with 20 golds, while the Soviet Union/CIS/Russia have 13 golds.

Medalists
The winners by season listed below.
Unofficial tournaments

Official tournaments
Key
 Number of tournaments (or 2nd, 3rd or 4th places) won at the time.

Medal table

The unofficial tournaments held prior to 1977 are not included in this table.

Countries in italics no longer compete at the World Championships.

See also
 List of IIHF World Championship medalists

References

Footnotes
 During the final game of the tournament, Canada and the Soviet Union became engaged in a violent bench-clearing brawl while Canada was leading 4–2. Consequently, the game was declared null and void, and both teams were ejected from the tournament; while the Soviets were out of medal contention, Canada was playing for the gold medal and were guaranteed at least a bronze.
 Canada will host the tournament every 3 or 4 years. In 1990, Canada decided to switch years with Finland.
General
 
 
 
 
Specific

External links
 International Ice Hockey Federation

Medalists
IIHF World Under-20
World Championship, Under-20, IIHF, medalists
IIHF World Under-20 Championship